State Street Corporation is an American financial services and bank holding company headquartered at One Lincoln Street in Boston with operations worldwide. It is the second-oldest continually operating United States bank; its predecessor, Union Bank, was founded in 1792. State Street is ranked 15th on the list of largest banks in the United States by assets. It is one of the largest asset management companies in the world with US$3.9 trillion under management and US$43.3 trillion under custody and administration. It is the largest custodian bank in the world, providing securities services and it is considered a systemically important bank by the Financial Stability Board. Along with BlackRock and Vanguard, State Street is considered to be one of the Big Three index fund managers that dominate corporate America.

The company is ranked 316th on the Fortune 500 as of 2022. The company is on the list of the banks that are too big to fail published by the Financial Stability Board.

The company is named after State Street in Boston, which was known as the "Great Street to the Sea" in the 18th century as Boston became a flourishing maritime capital. The company's logo formerly included a clipper to reflect the maritime industry in Boston during this time.

Current operations

Investment servicing: State Street Global Services
State Street Bank and Trust Company, also known as Global Services, is the securities services division of State Street that provides asset owners and managers with securities services (e.g. custody, corporate actions), fund accounting (pricing and valuation), and administration (financial reporting, tax, compliance, and legal) services. Global Services handles assets from many classes, including stocks, derivatives, exchange-traded funds, fixed income assets, private equity, and real estate. State Street administers 40% of the assets under administration in the US mutual fund market. Global Services also provides outsourcing for operations activities and handles US$10.2 trillion of middle-office assets.

Investment Management: State Street Global Advisors
State Street Global Advisors is the investment management division of State Street that provides asset management, research, and advisory services to corporations, mutual funds, insurance companies, and other institutional investors. Global Advisors develops both passive management and active management strategies using both quantitative and fundamental approaches.

1993 SPDR innovation
In 1993, the company created the SPDR S&P 500 Trust ETF, the first exchange-traded fund (ETF), and is now one of the largest ETF providers worldwide.

Trading on SPDR began January 29, 1993.

State Street Global Markets
Global Markets is State Street's securities business that offers research, trading, and securities lending services for foreign exchange, stocks, fixed income, and derivatives. To avoid a conflict of interest, the company does not run proprietary trading books. Global Markets maintains trading desks in Boston, London, Sydney, Toronto, and Tokyo.

History
The company traces its roots to Union Bank, which received a charter in 1792 from Massachusetts Governor John Hancock. It was the third bank to be chartered in Boston and its office was at the corner of State and Exchange Streets. In 1865, Union Bank received a national charter and became the National Union Bank of Boston. The bank later built a headquarters at Washington and State streets.

State Street Deposit & Trust Co opened in July 1891. The name was shortened to State Street Trust Company in 1897. It became the custodian of the first U.S. mutual fund in 1924, the Massachusetts Investors Trust (now MFS Investment Management).

20th century
State Street and National Union merged in October 1925. The merged bank took the State Street name, but National Union was the nominal survivor, and it operated under National Union's charter, thus giving the current entity its rank among the oldest banks in the United States.

The company merged with Second National Bank in 1955 and with the Rockland-Atlas National Bank in 1961.

In 1966, the company completed construction of the State Street Bank Building, a new headquarters building, the first high-rise office tower in downtown Boston.

In 1972, the company opened its first international office in Munich.

In 1973, as a 50/50 joint venture with DST Systems, the company formed Boston Financial Data Services, a provider of shareholder record-keeping, intermediary and investor services, and regulatory compliance. More than 100 top staff from IBM were hired by State Street as it set about implementing IBM mainframe computer systems.

In 1975, William Edgerly became president and chief executive officer of the bank and shifted the company's strategy from commercial banking to investments and securities processing.

During the 1980s and 1990s, the company opened offices in Montreal, Toronto, Dublin, London, Paris, Dubai, Sydney, Wellington, Hong Kong, and Tokyo.

By 1992, most of State Street's revenue came from fees for holding securities, settling trades, keeping records, and performing accounting. In 1994, the company formed State Street Global Advisors, a global asset management business.

In 1995, State Street acquired Investors Fiduciary Trust of Kansas City for $162 million from DST Systems and Kemper Financial Services. In 1996, Bank of New York acquired the unit investment trust servicing business of Investors Fiduciary Trust Co., Kansas City, Mo.

In 1997, State Street setup its office in Singapore.

In 1999, State Street sold its retail and commercial banking businesses to Citizens Financial Group.

21st century

In 2003, the company acquired the securities services division of Deutsche Bank for $1.5 billion. The company also sold its corporate trust business to U.S. Bancorp for $725 million. Also in 2003, State Street sold its private asset management business to U.S. Trust.

In July 2007, the company acquired Investors Bank & Trust for $4.5 billion.

In October 2008, the United States Department of the Treasury invested $2 billion in the company as part of the Troubled Asset Relief Program and in July 2009, the company became the first major financial firm to repay the Treasury.

In 2010, the company acquired Mourant International Finance Administration. It also acquired the securities services group of Intesa Sanpaolo for $1.87 billion. In December 2010, the company announced that it would be retrenching 5% of its workforce and effectively reducing the hourly wages of remaining employees by 10% via increased standard work hours.

In November 2011, the company was named as amongst the world's 29 systemic banks.

In 2012, the company acquired Goldman Sachs Administration Services, a  hedge fund administrator, for $550 million.

In November 2014, the company sold SSARIS Advisors, its hedge fund unit, to senior management.

In 2016, State Street launched a program called Beacon, focused on cutting costs and improving reporting technology. Their main focus was to shrink their US workforce in order to bolster profits in excess of $2.5 billion (2018 figures). Also in 2016, the company acquired the asset management business of General Electric.

In 2017, the company announced that Jay Hooley, the chief executive officer of the company, would retire.

In 2018, State Street completed its acquisition of Charles River Development, a Burlington, Massachusetts provider of investment management software. The deal closed October 1, 2018, at a cost of approximately $2.6 billion that will be financed by the suspension of share repurchases and the issuing of common and preferred equity. News of the acquisition led to a drop in State Street shares of nearly 10% with share prices remaining flat since the purchase.

In January 2019, State Street announced that it planned to lay off 1,500 employees, increasing the number to 2,300 in July. During that period, the company shifted their workforce from the United States to countries like China, India and Poland and operated under a hiring freeze. The increased overseas hiring resulted in a net gain of employment of over 3,000.

In September 2021, State Street agreed to buy Brown Brothers Harriman & Co.'s investor-services business for $3.5 billion in cash. Nearly a year since the announcement, the deal was pending regulatory approval. CEO O'Hanley noted that a restructuring of the business unit is expected to achieve the approval which would require negotiating a lower price with Brown Brothers. Following continued scrutiny in getting the regulatory approvals, the deal was mutually agreed to be dropped in November 2022.

Controversies

Currency trade fraud
In 2009, California alleged on behalf of its pension funds CalPERS and CalSTRS that State Street had committed fraud on currency trades handled by the custodian bank. In October 2011, two executives from State Street Global Markets left the company following charges over the pricing of a fixed income transaction. In April 2016, they were charged by the United States Department of Justice.

Non-disclosure of short position
On February 28, 2012, State Street Global Advisors entered into a consent order with the Massachusetts Securities Division. The Division was investigating the firm's role as the investment manager of a $1.65 billion (USD) hybrid collateralized debt obligation. The investigation resulted in a fine of $5 million (USD) for the non-disclosure of certain initial investors taking a short position on portions of the CDO.

Shareholder complaints
During the May 2012 annual shareholders meeting, chairman and chief executive Jay Hooley was shouted down on numerous occasions by protesters in relation to the outsourcing and other grievances.

Secret commissions
On January 18, 2017, State Street agreed to pay $64.6 million to resolve U.S. investigations into what prosecutors said was a scheme to defraud six clients through secret commissions on billions of dollars of trades.

In 2018 former employee of State Street, Edward Pennings was sentenced to six months in prison for his role in the scheme.  Employee Ross McLellan was also sentenced in the United States to 18 months in prison.

Fearless Girl statue
In March 2017, State Street Global Advisors commissioned a statue called Fearless Girl by Kristen Visbal and placed it temporarily in the Financial District, Manhattan, in front of the Wall Street icon Charging Bull. The statue is an advertisement for an index fund which comprises gender diverse companies that have a higher percentage of women among their senior leadership. While some have seen it as an encouragement of women in business, some women criticized the statue as "corporate feminism" that violated their own feminist principles. In October 2017, the company paid $5 million to settle a lawsuit charging that it had paid certain female and black executives less than their male and European-American peers.

Climate Change 
State Street announced in January 2020 that State Street Global Advisors will vote against directors of companies in major stock indices that do not meet targets for environmental, social and governance changes. According to Morningstar Proxy Data, State Street, "supported a majority of the climate-related disclosure requests that shareholders placed on the ballot," during the 2020 proxy season.

Financials

See also

 State Street Bank & Trust Co. v. Signature Financial Group, Inc. is a case in which the United States Court of Appeals for the Federal Circuit ruled on July 23, 1998, that a computer algorithm can be patented to the extent that it produces "a useful, concrete and tangible result".

References

External links

Archives and records 
 State Street Bank records at Harvard Business School.

1792 establishments in Massachusetts
Banks based in Massachusetts
Companies based in Boston
Financial services companies established in 1792
Companies listed on the New York Stock Exchange
Systemically important financial institutions
American companies established in 1792